Lucas Pereira Vita (born March 1, 1985 in São Paulo) is a male water polo player from Brazil. He competed for his native country at the 2007 Pan American Games, where he claimed the silver medal with the Brazil men's national water polo team.

References
 Profile

1985 births
Living people
Brazilian male water polo players
Water polo players from São Paulo
Pan American Games silver medalists for Brazil
Pan American Games medalists in water polo
Water polo players at the 2007 Pan American Games
Medalists at the 2007 Pan American Games
21st-century Brazilian people